Daemilus is a genus of moths belonging to the subfamily Tortricinae of the family Tortricidae.

Species
Daemilus fulva (Filipjev, 1962)
Daemilus mutuurai Yasuda, 1975
Daemilus rufapex Razowski, 2009
Daemilus rufus Razowski, 2009

See also
List of Tortricidae genera

References

 , 1972, Bull. Univ. Osaka Pref. (B) 24: 81.
 ,2005 World Catalogue of Insects, 5

External links
tortricidae.com

Archipini
Tortricidae genera